The 2023 Italian Basketball Cup, known as the Frecciarossa Final Eight 2023 for sponsorship reasons, is the 55th edition of Italy's national cup tournament. The competition is managed by the Lega Basket for LBA clubs. The tournament will be played from 15 to 19 February 2023 in Turin, Piedmont, at the end of the first half of the 2022–23 LBA season.

Olimpia Milano are the defending champions.

All times are in Central European Time (UTC+01:00)''.

Qualification 
Qualified for the tournament are selected based on their position on the league table at the end of the first half of the 2022–23 LBA regular season.

Bracket

Quarterfinals

EA7 Emporio Armani Milano vs. Germani Brescia

Carpegna Prosciutto Pesaro vs. Openjobmetis Varese

Virtus Segafredo Bologna vs. Umana Reyer Venezia

Bertram Derthona Tortona vs. Dolomiti Energia Trentino

References

External links

2022–23 in Italian basketball
Italian Basketball Cup